Raasiku Parish in Harju County is located in the south-eastern direction from the city of Tallinn. The main road leading through the parish is Jüri - Aruküla - Raasiku - Jägala road. The Tallinn - Tapa Railway goes through the northern border of the parish.

Demographics 
As for neighbouring administrative divisions, the parish is surrounded by Jõelähtme in the north, by Anija in the east, by Kose in the south and by Rae parish in the west.

2 small towns: Aruküla, Raasiku

13 villages: Härma, Igavere, Järsi, Kalesi, Kiviloo, Kulli, Kurgla, Mallavere, Peningi, Perila, Pikavere, Rätla, Tõhelgi.

Religion

Symbolics 
Both the municipal flag and coat of arms have been in use since 1995.

The coat of arms of the municipality symbolizes the beautiful pine forest of Aruküla, pine-like perseverance that helps people promote the economy and spiritual life of their home region. The green diagonal area resembles the other biggest small borough Raasiku with its small drumlins surrounding the small borough. Green resembles nature and silver hope and purity.

Administration

Local government bodies 

 Council of the Rural Municipality [17 members] (Representative body; elected by adult residents of the municipality.)
 Chairman of Municipal Council: Maarja Sikut
 Deputy Chairman of Municipal Council: Kadi Tammaru
 Rural Municipality Government [5 members] (Executive body; established by the council.)

As of 1 March 2020, the Government structure is as follows:

 Rural Municipality Mayor
 Office of the Rural Municipality
 Department of Education and Social Affairs
 Department of Administration and Development 
 Department of Finance

List of Rural Municipality Mayors 

 1992 - Toivo Veenre
 1996 - Olev Rähni
 1999 - Andre Sepp (3.5 terms)
 2011 - Aare Ets
 2013 - Raivo Uukkivi
 2017 - Andre Sepp
 2021 - Raul Siem

Education and culture

Schools 
 Aruküla Basic School
 Raasiku Basic School
 Pikavere Kindergarten Primary School
 Aruküla Waldorf School

Twin towns – sister cities 
 , Sweden

People
Raasiku is the birthplace of chess player Aino Kukk (1930-2006), who won the Estonian Women's Chess Championship in 1955.

Gallery

See also
Raasiku FC Joker

References

External links
Official website (available only in Estonian)

Footnotes 

 
Municipalities of Estonia